A-Mobile is the second mobile phone operator of Abkhazia behind Aquafon, both in number of subscriptions and in age.

History

A-Mobile started its operations on November 25, 2006 in Sukhumi. By April 2007 it counted 12,000 subscribers. Since June 10, 2007 it provides to its clients international roaming in Russia through Beeline, and to Russian users international roaming in Abkhazia. By September 2007 the number of subscriptions had risen to 21,000. On March 1, 2008, A-Mobile started to provide GPRS services.

Competition

A-Mobile's main competitor is Aquafon.

External links
a-mobile.biz - The official website of A-Mobile

References

Mobile phone companies of Abkhazia